Lynge is a family name of Danish and Swedish origin. The name is pronounced  in Swedish. 

Examples include:
Aqqaluk Lynge - a co-founder of the Inuit Ataqatigiit
Bernt Arne Lynge - a Norwegian botanist whose taxonomic author abbreviation is Lynge
Simon Lynge - a singer-songwriter raised in Greenland
Herman H. J. Lynge - Danish antiquarian bookseller

In Denmark, Lynge is also the name of several towns, including:
Lynge, Allerød Municipality, Allerød Municipality